Jorge Edgardo Menéndez Corte (13 August 1951 – 11 April 2019) was an Uruguayan doctor and politician who served as Minister of Defense from August 2016 to April 2019.

References

1951 births
2019 deaths
Defence ministers of Uruguay
Broad Front (Uruguay) politicians